Paralimnophila is a genus of fly in the family Limoniidae. Its members are found in Asia & Australasia.

Species
Subgenus Papuaphila Alexander, 1947
P. angusticincta Alexander, 1960
P. apicalis (de Meijere, 1913)
P. contingens (Walker, 1865)
P. decorata Alexander, 1960
P. delecta Alexander, 1962
P. euchroma (Walker, 1861)
P. euryphaea (Alexander, 1947)
P. fuscoabdominalis (Alexander, 1947)
P. holoxantha Alexander, 1962
P. perdiffusa Alexander, 1962
P. selectissima (Walker, 1864)
P. sponsa Alexander, 1960
P. terminalis (Walker, 1861)
P. toxopeana Alexander, 1960
Subgenus Paralimnophila Alexander, 1921
P. albofasciata (Alexander, 1934)
P. alice Theischinger, 1996
P. artursiana Theischinger, 1996
P. aurantiipennis (Alexander, 1923)
P. aurantionigra Alexander, 1978
P. barockee Theischinger, 1996
P. barringtonia (Alexander, 1928)
P. bicincta (Alexander, 1928)
P. bingelima Theischinger, 1996
P. boobootella Theischinger, 1996
P. caledonica (Alexander, 1948)
P. christine Theischinger, 1996
P. conspersa (Enderlein, 1912)
P. cooloola Theischinger, 1996
P. danbulla Theischinger, 1996
P. decincta (Alexander, 1928)
P. diffusior Alexander, 1968
P. dobrotworskyi Theischinger, 1996
P. emarginata Alexander, 1981
P. eucrypta (Alexander, 1931)
P. eungella Theischinger, 1996
P. flammeola Alexander, 1924
P. flavipes (Alexander, 1922)
P. fraudulenta Alexander, 1924
P. fuscodorsata (Alexander, 1928)
P. gingera Theischinger, 1996
P. gracilirama (Alexander, 1937)
P. grampiana Theischinger, 1996
P. guttulicosta (Alexander, 1934)
P. harrisoni (Alexander, 1928)
P. hybrida Theischinger, 1996
P. incompta (Alexander, 1928)
P. indecora (Alexander, 1922)
P. infestiva (Alexander, 1929)
P. irrorata (Philippi, 1866)
P. isolata (Alexander, 1947)
P. kosciuskana (Alexander, 1929)
P. leucophaeata (Skuse, 1890)
P. macquarie Theischinger, 1996
P. maxwelliana Theischinger, 1996
P. minuscula (Alexander, 1922)
P. mossmanensis Theischinger, 1996
P. murdunna Theischinger, 1996
P. mystica (Alexander, 1928)
P. neboissi Theischinger, 1996
P. neocaledonica (Alexander, 1945)
P. nigritarsis Alexander, 1969
P. pachyspila (Alexander, 1928)
P. pallidicornis (Alexander, 1930)
P. pallitarsis (Alexander, 1929)
P. pectinella (Alexander, 1937)
P. perirrorata (Alexander, 1928)
P. perreducta (Alexander, 1939)
P. pewingi Theischinger, 1996
P. pirioni (Alexander, 1928)
P. praesignis (Alexander, 1930)
P. puella Alexander, 1924
P. punctipennis (Westwood, 1836)
P. rara (Alexander, 1929)
P. remingtoni (Alexander, 1948)
P. remulsa (Alexander, 1928)
P. rieki Theischinger, 1996
P. serraticornis (Alexander, 1923)
P. setulicornis (Alexander, 1928)
P. shewani (Alexander, 1929)
P. signifera (Alexander, 1931)
P. skusei (Hutton, 1902)
P. stolida (Alexander, 1930)
P. stradbrokensis Alexander, 1978
P. stygipes (Alexander, 1929)
P. styligera (Alexander, 1930)
P. subfuscata (Alexander, 1921)
P. tarra Theischinger, 1996
P. terania Theischinger, 1996
P. tortilis Alexander, 1968
P. unicincta (Alexander, 1928)
P. victoria (Alexander, 1922)
P. wataganensis Theischinger, 1996
P. wilsoniana (Alexander, 1943)
P. winta Theischinger, 1996

References

Limoniidae
Diptera of Australasia
Diptera of Asia